The Winterthur trolleybus system forms part of the public transport network that serves Winterthur, in the canton of Zürich, Switzerland.

Opened on 28 December 1938, the system gradually replaced the Winterthur tramway network.

History
The individual line sections of the Winterthur trolleybus system went into operation as follows:

With the timetable change on 23 May 1982, the Rosenberg line (line 3) was separated from the Breite line (a new line 4).  The latter line, which operated as a circle line, was converted back into a diesel bus service on 28 May 1995, and the last remaining traces of its overhead wires disappeared at the end of January 2010.

Meanwhile, in December 2006, lines 3 and 6 were merged into the present line 3.

Lines 

The present system is made up of the following lines, all of them cross-city routes:

Fleet

Evolution
The Winterthur trolleybus system was operated initially by conventional length, two-axle vehicles.  In 1957, the first five articulated trolleybuses were ordered.  They entered service in 1959.

In 1997, Stadtbus Winterthur sold a few trolleybuses to the Romanian city of Timișoara. Other trolleybuses were sold in 1998 to the Bulgarian city of Ruse, and, a year later, to Burgas, also in Bulgaria.

In March 2004, an order for 10 articulated trolleybuses was placed with Solaris Bus & Coach. In November 2005, the first trolleybus in this order was delivered. By the end of 2005, all had entered service; they replaced the Saurer trolleybuses nos. 122–131.

Current fleet

See also

List of trolleybus systems in Switzerland

References

External links

 Stadtbus Winterthur – history of public transport in Winterthur 
 Stadtbus Winterthur – trolleybus fleet 
  Winterthur public transport map
 
 

Transport in Winterthur
Winterthur
Winterthur
1938 establishments in Switzerland